Jānis Pavlovičs (born 16 September 1984) is a Latvian handball player for Sandefjord TIF and the Latvian national team.

He represented Latvia at the 2020 European Men's Handball Championship.

References

1984 births
Living people
Latvian male handball players
Expatriate handball players
Latvian expatriate sportspeople in Norway